Sohmor     is a small town in the Beka'a Valley of Lebanon, situated in the Western Beqaa District and south of the Beqaa Governorate. It lies south of Lake Qaraoun on the Litani River. It lies southwest of Machgara, northeast of Ain Et Tine, north of Yohmor, west of Mazret Al Chmis and northwest of Libbaya.

History
In 1838, Eli Smith noted  Sahmur  as a  village on the West side of the Beqaa Valley, north of Yohmor.

It was the site of the 1984 Sohmor massacre and the 1996 Sohmor massacre.

References

Bibliography

External links
Sohmor, Localiban 
Video

Populated places in Western Beqaa District